Anders Chydenius (26 February 1729 – 1 February 1803) was a Swedish-Finnish Lutheran priest and a member of the Swedish Riksdag, and is known as the leading classical liberal of Nordic history.

Born in Sotkamo, Finland (then part of Sweden) and having studied under Pehr Kalm at the Royal Academy of Åbo, Chydenius became a priest and Enlightenment philosopher. He was elected as an ecclesiastic member of the Swedish Riksdag of the Estates in 1765–66, in which his Cap party seized the majority and government and championed Sweden's first Freedom of the Press Act, the most liberal in the world along with those of Great Britain and the Seven United Provinces. Vehemently opposed to the extreme interventionist policies of mercantilism preached by the previously predominant Hat party since decades, he was ultimately coerced into retirement for his criticism of the Cap administration's radical deregulation policies and their social and political consequences.

Following Gustav III's coup d'état in 1772, which meant the end of parliamentary rule for another century, Chydenius briefly returned to prominence and worked to increase civil liberties and economic freedom as part of Gustav's doctrine of enlightened despotism, and contributed to the abolishment of torture as means of interrogation, the limitation of capital punishment, and the legalisation of Jewish and Catholic immigration into Sweden. Ultimately, the king's increasingly autocratic position brought Chydenius out of favour again, and he retired to private life in Ostrobothnia, where he died at age 73.

An early pioneer—also by international standards—and proponent of economic liberalism, freedom of religion, freedom of speech and migration (writing a pamphlet on the invisible hand a decade before the publication of The Wealth of Nations) he was one of the first comprehensive philosophers of liberalism.

Biography

Early life 

Anders Chydenius was born in 1729 in Sotkamo, Ostrobothnia (now part of Kainuu region) where his father Jacob was a chaplain. The family moved to Kuusamo in 1734 where his father became a parish rector. Anders' childhood was spent in the barren area of northern Finland. He and his brother Samuel were taught privately by their father and then they went to Oulu grammar school (Uleåborg trivialskola). After the Russo-Swedish War (1741–1743), the boys studied privately in Tornio and entered The Royal Academy of Åbo in 1745. They also studied at Uppsala University. Anders studied mathematics, natural sciences, Latin and philosophy. In 1746 the father Jacob and family moved to Kokkola.

Nedervetil 
In 1753, after graduation, Anders was appointed preacher of the Chapel of the dependent parish of Nedervetil (today, part of Kronoby) in Ostrobothnia. He was married in 1755 to Beata Magdalena Mellberg, daughter of a merchant from Jakobstad. The couple was childless.
While in Nedervetil he was active in many projects such as the clearing of the marshes, experimenting with new breeds of animals and plants, and adopting new methods of cultivation of potatoes and tobacco. His aim was to enlighten the peasants by example. Chydenius practiced medicine and became known by inoculating ordinary people against smallpox. He also performed cataract operations and prepared medicines.

The 1765–1766 Riksdag of the Estates 

Some of his first writings were about practical matters such as the moss overgrowing the meadows, and improvements in the design of horse carriages. Then he moved on to social questions and became known as a writer and speaker. He was sent to the Diet in 1765 to obtain free trading rights for the towns of Ostrobothnia. The cities of Gamlakarleby, Vasa (Finnish: Vaasa), Björneborg (Finnish: Pori) and Uleåborg received navigational rights which helped with their later development as well as helping all of Ostrobothnia. At that time, the tar which should have brought prosperity to his town and the coast had to be sold abroad through Stockholm, which made most of the profits. Largely due to Chydenius' efforts, Stockholm's monopoly was broken and from 1765, the towns gained freedom to sell and ship tar directly to foreign customers.

Chydenius participated actively in the Diet, and published several articles of criticism which caused a great stir. One of the results of his activities in the Diet was a stricter parliamentary control of the government budget. He considered that one of his greatest achievements was an extension of the freedom of the press. His radical activities caused him to be excluded from the Diet by his own political party in 1766.

Kokkola 
In 1770 he was appointed rector of Gamlakarleby where he concentrated on parish work. He maintained his own orchestra, and rehearsed with them. They gave concerts in the rectory's reception hall. His father lived in the parsonage at Gamlakarleby from 1746 to 1766, and Anders lived there from 1770 to 1803.

Between 1778 and 1779 Anders Chydenius once again participated in the Diet, at which the position of hired hands was brought up. He championed the rights of the servant class. At the suggestion of King Gustavus III, he introduced a bill whereby foreigners were also granted limited rights to practice their own religion. He participated in the Diet again in 1793 and was active as a writer covering the development of agriculture, the burning of saltpeter, smallpox, and the settlement of Lapland. One of his main tasks during his latter years was the supervision of building an extension to the old parish church. In 1796 he became a member of the Swedish society Pro Fide et Christianismo, founded to promote Christian education, along with his nephew Jakob Tengström. He died in 1803.

Ideas 
Chydenius focused his liberal writings on attacking the mercantilism, mercantilist conquest politics, conservatism, protectionism and privilege that were prevalent at the time. In his view, state offices should not be for sale and the state should not impose any restrictions or privileges on any act. He criticised the clergy, nobility, civil servants and other privileged people, saying that they lived off the work of peasants, seeking to turn the debate on the status of peasants into a debate on the status of the privileged. The prevailing view was that peasants and workers had to be kept poor to prevent them from idling. Chydenius showed that, on the contrary, workers were not idlers who should be forced to make the state rich, but vital individuals who, free to pursue their own happiness, would also benefit others.

Chydenius was in favour of peace, demanded full and inviolable land ownership, wanted to give refugees protection and peasants and artisans the right to sell their products whenever and wherever they wanted. He opposed price and wage regulation and the labour strike, and demanded the right of workers to choose their employers. To save sparsely populated Lapland, he proposed turning it into a night-watchman state.

Free trade 

In 1765 Chydenius published a pamphlet called The National Gain (Den nationnale winsten), in which he proposes ideas of free trade and industry, explores the relationship between economy and society, and lays out the principles for liberalism, capitalism, and modern democracy. In the book Chydenius published theories closely corresponding to Adam Smith's invisible hand, eleven years before Smith published his book, The Wealth of Nations.

Chydenius also put his theories into practice by proposing to the Riksdag of the Estates a drastic trade liberalization of towns along the Gulf of Bothnia. However, most of his other propositions were not realized, such as turning Lapland to a nightwatchman state to make the poor province prosper economically:

 – free state, private ownership and individual freedom. Inhabitants could choose whatever profession, freedom of trade would be complete, there would be no privileges, regulation or taxes. Bureaucracy would be nonexistent, and the only officer would be a judge who would oversee that no-one's rights would be suppressed.

Freedom of expression 

Chydenius became a great proponent of freedom of the press. In a report published in 1776, he wrote:

No evidence should be needed that a certain freedom of writing and printing is one of the strongest bulwarks of a free organisation of the state, as without it, the estates would not have sufficient information for the drafting of good laws, and those dispensing justice would not be monitored, nor would the subjects know the requirements of the law, the limits of the rights of government, and their own responsibilities. Education and good conduct would be crushed; coarseness in thought, speech, and manners would prevail, and dimness would darken the entire sky of our freedom in a few years.

Natural equality 

Chydenius was  outspoken about universal rights and the abolition of privilege. He wanted to give the poor the same freedom as for everybody else and argued for the good of the poor, which was then rather exceptional among politicians. He promoted democracy and defended the freedom of religion, freedom of speech, freedom of trade and industry, and the workers rights. He called for an oversight of the way the state funds were spent. In modern language we would say he advocated openness and good governance.

In a 1778 essay, Thoughts Upon the Natural Rights of Servants and Peasants, he wrote:

Nature shapes them exactly like us. Their posture in the crib is the same as ours, their souls have the same reason as other peoples', whereby it is plain to see that the Lord of creation also had intended them to have equal rights with other people.

Legacy 

Chydenius can be seen as a major influence on Nordic thinkers as well as real-life politics, strictly promoting classical liberalism. He has been labeled the father of Swedish liberalism. Both Sweden and Finland include him among their historical notables, and he is variably categorized either Swedish or Finnish by nationality.

Anders Chydenius is remembered as a man ahead of his time, expressing ideas that were radical in his day, but are now the backbone of the Nordic ideology. He can also be seen as an Enlightenment thinker, an advocate of science, arts, rational thinking and freedom. He was also a scientist and skilled eye-surgeon, the maker of several inventions, a pioneer of vaccination in Finland and the founder of an orchestra.

Chydenius was featured on the highest valued bank note (1000 marks) of the Finnish mark's last design series. There are also many place names referring to Chydenius in Kokkola, such as the Chydenia Shopping Center, which was completed in the town center in 2006.

Anders Chydenius was selected as the main motif in a recent Finnish commemorative coin, the €10 Anders Chydenius commemorative coin, minted in 2003. The obverse features an open book, referring to Chydenius's numerous publications and the Bible. On the reverse, a traditional village with a church and other buildings can be seen.

In the book Historiens 100 viktigaste svenskar ("100 Most Important Swedes in History"), written by Niklas Ekdal and Petter Karlsson, Chydenius was ranked as the seventeenth most important Swede in history. In Finland, Chydenius was ranked on the place #40 in the list of "Greatest Finns" in a voting contest organised by the national broadcasting company.

The Chydenius family is even today a well known cultural family in Finland. Composer Kaj Chydenius is Anders's distant relative.

Selected works 
 Americanska näfwerbåtar. Åbo 1753. (American Bark Boats.)
 Svar På samma Fråga (Om bästa sättet at upodla Mosslupna Ängar). Stockholm 1762. (How to Cultivate Mossy Meadows.)
 Svar på samma Fråga (Angående Kärrors Förbättring). Stockholm 1764. (The Improvement of Waggons.)
 Wederläggning Af de Skäl, Hwarmed man söker bestrida Öster- och Wästerbottniska Samt Wäster-Norrländske Städerne Fri Seglation. Stockholm 1765. (Counter-arguments to Those Who Would Attempt to Oppose Free Navigation between the Towns of Ostrobothnia, Västerbotten and Norland.)
 Swar På den af Kgl. Wetenskaps Academien förestälta Frågan: Hwad kan wara orsaken, at sådan myckenhet Swenskt folk årligen flytter utur Landet? Stockholm 1765. (For What Reason do so Many Swedes Emigrate Every Year?)
 Källan Til Rikets Wan-Magt. Stockholm 1765. (The Source of the Weakness of the Kingdom.)
 Den Nationnale Winsten. Wördsamast öfwerlemnad Til Riksens Höglofliga Ständer, Af En Deras Ledamot. Stockholm 1765. (The National Gain.)
 Omständeligt Swar, På den genom Trycket utkomne Wederläggning af Skriften, Kallad: Källan til Rikets Wanmagt, Jämte Anmärkningar Öfwer De wid samma Källa anstälda Wattu-Prof. Stockholm 1765. (In Reply to Critiques Applying to The Source of the Weakness of the Kingdom.)
 Berättelse Om Chinesiska Skrif-Friheten, Öfversatt af Danskan. Stockholm 1766. (A Report on the Freedom of the Press in China.)
 Rikets Hjelp, Genom en Naturlig Finance-System. Stockholm 1766. (Assisting the Kingdom through a Natural Monetary System.)
 Tal Hållet Vid Vår Allernådigste Konungs, Konung Gustaf III:s Höga Kröning, Den 29 Maji 1772. Stockholm 1772. (Speech on the Occasion of the Coronation of Gustavus III.)
 Svar På Vetenskaps och Vitterhets Samhällets I Götheborg Förestälta Fråga: Huruvida Landthandel för ett Rike i gemen är nyttig eller skadelig, och hvad mon den bidrager til industriens uplifvande eller aftagande? Stockholm 1777. (Is Rural Trade Advantageous or Disadvantageous to the Kingdom, and to What Extent does it Affect the Progress or Decline in Means of Livelihood?)
 Tankar Om Husbönders och Tienstehions Naturliga Rätt. Stockholm 1778. (Thoughts upon the Natural Rights of Servants and Peasants.)
 Memorial, Angående Religions-Frihet. Stockholm 1779. (Memorandum on the Freedom of Religious Faith.)
 Predikningar öfver Tio Guds Bud. Upsala 1781–82. (Sermons on the Ten Commandments.)
 Predikningar öfver Andra Hufvudstycket i Catechesen. Homiletiska försök. Vol. VI. St. 2. Stockholm 1784. (Sermons on the Second Main Part of the Catechism.)
 Om Saltpetter-Sjuderierna, särledes i Österbotten. Skrifter af Sällskapet för Allmänne Medborgerlige kunskaper II. Stockholm 1795. (Preparation of Saltpetre.)
 Tankar om Koppympningen För Finlands Allmoge. K. Finska Hushållnings-Sällskapets Handlingar 1. Åbo 1803. (Thoughts on Inoculating against Smallpox for the Finnish People.)

See also
 Contributions to liberal theory
 History of economic thought
 Nordic model

References

Further reading

 Anders Chydenius: Anticipating The Wealth of Nations: The Selected Works of Anders Chydenius (1729–1803). Translated from the original by Peter C. Hogg. London: Routledge, 2012. . Editors Maren Jonasson and Pertti Hyttinen.
 Hyttinen, Pertti. Anders Chydenius Defender of Freedom and Democracy. Kokkola: Chydenius Institute of the University of Jyväskylä, 1994. 
 Mustonen, Juha. The World's First Freedom of Information Act Anders Chydenius' Legacy Today. Anders Chydenius Foundation publications, 2. Kokkola: Anders Chydenius Foundation, 2006. 
 
 Uhr, Carl G. Anders Chydenius 1729–1803 A Finnish Predecessor to Adam Smith. Meddelanden från Nationalekonomiska institutionen vid Handelshögskolan vid Åbo akademi, 6. Åbo: Nationalekonomiska institutionen vid Handelshögskolan vid Åbo akademi, 1963.

External links

 Chydenius Foundation
 The National Gain  Chydenius' most famous book in English translation
 
 
 Anders Chydenius The National Gain (1765)

1729 births
1803 deaths
18th-century economists
18th-century Swedish politicians
18th-century Swedish writers
18th-century Finnish writers
19th-century Finnish economists
19th-century Finnish writers
19th-century Swedish writers
19th-century male writers
Age of Liberty people
Classical economists
18th-century Finnish Lutheran clergy
Finnish philosophers
Finnish politicians
Members of the Riksdag of the Estates
People from Sotkamo
Swedish-speaking Finns
Swedish classical liberals
Free speech activists